Bay Creek is a stream in Oregon County in the Ozarks of southern Missouri. It is a tributary of the Warm Fork Spring River.

The stream source area lies adjacent to the eastern Koshkonong city limits and the stream meanders east to join the Warm Fork Spring River at Wiggs Ford.

Bay Creek was so named on account of a small inlet near its mouth.

See also
List of rivers of Missouri

References

Rivers of Oregon County, Missouri
Rivers of Missouri